Coles may refer to:

Businesses
Coles Supermarkets, a supermarket chain in Australia
Coles Group, parent company of Coles Supermarkets, Coles Online, Coles Express, Coles Liquor and flybuys  
Coles (bookstore), a bookstore chain in Canada, a division of Indigo Books and Music

Places
Coles, Illinois, Coles County, Illinois, United States
Coles, Mississippi, Amite County, Mississippi, United States
Coles, Ourense, Galicia, Spain
Coles, South Australia, Australia
Coles Bay, Tasmania, Australia
Electoral district of Coles in South Australia, renamed to Morialta in the 1998 electoral redistribution
Coles County, Illinois

Other uses
Coles 4038, ribbon microphone produced by Coles Electroacoustics
 Coles (surname)
 Coles (given name)

See also
 Coales (surname)